Roy McCune is a former Irish international lawn bowler. and current Ireland team Manager.

Bowls career
He won a bronze medal in the fours at the 1986 Commonwealth Games in Edinburgh with Billie Montgomery, William Watson and Ernie Parkinson.

References

Living people
Male lawn bowls players from Northern Ireland
Bowls players at the 1986 Commonwealth Games
Commonwealth Games bronze medallists for Northern Ireland
Commonwealth Games medallists in lawn bowls
Year of birth missing (living people)
Medallists at the 1986 Commonwealth Games